Joshua Baan (born 31 August 1995) is a New Zealand long-distance runner.

In 2019, he competed in the senior men's race at the 2019 IAAF World Cross Country Championships held in Aarhus, Denmark. He finished in 128th place.

References

External links 
 

Living people
1995 births
Place of birth missing (living people)
New Zealand male long-distance runners
New Zealand male cross country runners